Jeremy Waldron (born 13 October 1953) is a New Zealand professor of law and philosophy. He holds a University Professorship at the New York University School of Law, is affiliated with the New York University Department of Philosophy, and was formerly the Chichele Professor of Social and Political Theory at All Souls College, Oxford University. Waldron also holds an adjunct professorship at Victoria University of Wellington. Waldron is regarded as one of the world's leading legal and political philosophers.

Early life and education
Waldron attended Southland Boys' High School, and then went on to study at the University of Otago, New Zealand, where he graduated with a B.A. in 1974 and an LL.B. in 1978. He later studied for a D.Phil. at Lincoln College, Oxford under legal philosopher Ronald Dworkin and political theorist Alan Ryan; Waldron graduated in 1986.

Career
He also taught legal and political philosophy at Otago (1975–78), Lincoln College, Oxford (1980–82), the University of Edinburgh, Scotland (1983–87), the Jurisprudence and Social Policy Program at Berkeley Law (1986–96), Princeton University (1996–97), and Columbia Law School (1997–2006). He has also been a visiting professor at Cornell (1989–90), Otago (1991–92) and Columbia (1995) Universities. Currently at NYU he teaches Rule of Law, Jurisprudence, seminars on Property and Human Dignity and regularly hosts the Colloquium on Legal, Social and Political Philosophy, founded by Ronald Dworkin and Thomas Nagel in 1987, and currently convened by Liam Murphy, Samuel Scheffler, and Waldron.

Waldron gave the second series of Seeley Lectures at Cambridge University in 1996, the 1999 Carlyle Lectures at Oxford, the spring 2000 University Lecture at Columbia Law School, the Wesson Lectures at Stanford University in 2004, the Storrs Lectures at Yale Law School in 2007, and the Gifford Lectures at the University of Edinburgh in 2015. He was elected to the American Academy of Arts and Sciences in 1998.

In 2005, Waldron received an honorary doctorate from the University of Otago, his alma mater.

Waldron was elected to the American Philosophical Society in 2015.

In 2019, a Professorial Chair in Jurisprudence was created in his name at the University of Otago.

Legal and philosophical views
Waldron is a liberal and a normative legal positivist. He has written extensively on the analysis and justification of private property and on the political and legal philosophy of John Locke. He is an outspoken opponent of judicial review and of torture, both of which he believes to be in tension with democratic principles. He believes that hate speech should not be protected by the First Amendment. His later work is devoted to providing a non-religious and non-Kantian concept of human dignity, based on a thought experiment of leveling up all human beings to the high rank of nobility or aristocracy, thus constituting a single rank or caste. He has been working on this topic since he gave the Tanner Lectures on the subject in 2009, published in 2012 as Dignity, Rank and Rights.

Waldron has also criticised analytic legal philosophy for its failure to engage with the questions addressed by political theory.

Criticism of judicial review
Sandrine Baume has identified Jeremy Waldron and Bruce Ackerman as leading critics of the "compatibility of judicial review with the very principles of democracy". Baume identified John Hart Ely alongside Dworkin as the foremost defenders of this principle in recent years, while the opposition to this principle of "compatibility" were identified as Bruce Ackerman and Jeremy Waldron. In contrast to Waldron and Ackerman, Dworkin was a long-time advocate of a moral reading of the United States Constitution, whose lines of support he sees as strongly associated with enhanced versions of judicial review in the federal government.

A staunch defender of the principle of democratic legislation, in an article titled "The Core of the Case against Judicial Review", Waldron has argued for a limited role for judicial review in a robust democratic government. Waldron asserts that there is no inherent advantage to a judiciary's protection of rights than to a legislature's if (1) there is a broadly democratic political system with appropriate suffrage and process, (2) there is a system of courts somewhat insulated from popular pressure and engaged in judicial review, there is a general commitment to rights, and there is disagreement as to the content and extent of rights. Even so, Waldron does not argue against the existence of judicial review, which may be appropriate when there is institutional dysfunction. In this case, the defense of judicial review compatible with democracy is limited to remedies for that dysfunction and are neither unlimited nor universal. Thus Waldron places his view of judicial review in the tradition of Justice Harlan Fiske Stone.

Affinity with judicial minimalism
In a review of a 2015 book by Cass Sunstein, Waldron has stated that between the polarity represented by judges who can be "heroic" in the interpretation of their judgments and those who abstain, that his preference would be sympathetic to a position which could be described as "judicial minimalism". Waldron states his examples of such judges as including Sandra O'Connor, Ruth Ginsburg, and Felix Frankfurter.

Personal life 
Waldron's longtime partner is Columbia Law School professor Carol Sanger.

Publications
Books
 1984. Theories of Rights, edited vol. 
 1988. The Right to Private Property. , 
 1988. Nonsense Upon Stilts: Bentham, Burke and Marx on the Rights of Man, edited vol. 
 1990. The Law: Theory and Practice in British Politics. 
 1993. Liberal Rights: Collected Papers 1981–91. 
 1999. The Dignity of Legislation, Seeley Lectures. ,  (Portuguese translation)
 1999. Law and Disagreement. 
 2002. God, Locke and Equality. 
 2010. Torture, Terror, and Trade-Offs: Philosophy for the White House. 
 2012. The Harm in Hate Speech, Oliver Wendell Holmes Lectures. 
 2012. "Partly Laws Common To All Mankind": Foreign Law in American Courts. 
 2012. The Rule of Law and the Measure of Property, Hamlyn Lectures. 
 2012. Dignity, Rank and Rights (Meir Dan Cohen: editor), Oxford University Press. 
 2016. Political Political Theory, Harvard University Press. 
 2017. One Another's Equals: The Basis of Human Equality, Harvard University Press. 
Articles
 2001, "Normative (or Ethical) Positivism" in Jules Coleman (ed.), Hart's Postscript: Essays on the Postscript to The Concept of Law. New York: Oxford University Press. 
 2003, "Who is my Neighbor?: Humanity and Proximity," The Monist 86.
 2004, "Settlement, Return, and the Supersession Thesis," Theoretical Inquiries in Law 5.
 2004, "Terrorism and the Uses of Terror," The Journal of Ethics, Vol. 8, No. 1, Terrorism (2004) pp. 5–35.
 2005, "Torture and Positive Law: Jurisprudence for the White House," Columbia Law Review 105.
 2006, "The Core of the Case Against Judicial Review," Yale Law Journal 115.
 2009, "Dignity and Defamation: The Visibility of Hate" ". 2009 Oliver Wendell Holmes Lectures.
 2012, "Bicameralism and the Separation of Powers," Current Legal Problems 31.

References

External links

 NYU Law Faculty Profile.
 NYU's Big Raid New York Observer, 13 March 2006 (on Waldron's appointment at NYU).
 Debate with John Yoo on torture.
 Waldron archive from The New York Review of Books
 "NYU's Waldron to Take Up Chichele Chair at Oxford on Half-Time Basis" Leiter Reports, 17 December 2009.

1953 births
Living people
Alumni of Lincoln College, Oxford
Christian philosophers
New York University faculty
New Zealand expatriates in the United States
20th-century New Zealand lawyers
New Zealand philosophers
New Zealand political philosophers
People educated at Southland Boys' High School
Philosophers of law
Political philosophers
Oceanian social liberals
Chichele Professors of Social and Political Theory
University of Otago alumni
20th-century philosophers
21st-century philosophers
20th-century New Zealand writers
20th-century New Zealand male writers
20th-century male writers
21st-century New Zealand writers
Fellows of All Souls College, Oxford
Legal scholars of the University of Oxford
New York University School of Law faculty
Academics of the University of Edinburgh
Columbia Law School faculty
Locke scholars